Bruce George Wells (born 4 June 1937) was a rugby union player who represented Australia.

Wells, a fly-half, was born in Orange, New South Wales and claimed 1 international rugby cap for Australia.

References

Australian rugby union players
Australia international rugby union players
1937 births
Living people
Rugby union players from New South Wales
Rugby union fly-halves